XHEOF-FM is a radio station on 101.9 FM in Cortázar, Guanajuato. It is owned by TVR Comunicaciones and is known as Radio Juventud with an adult contemporary format.

History
XEOF-AM received its concession on July 4, 1967. It was owned by Raúl Paniagua Bustos and broadcast on 1510 kHz. The 250-watt station was originally to be given to Edaena Carmona Tovar, but Paniagua Bustos filed a petition to deny and was ultimately awarded the concession. In 1979, control passed to Radiofónica del Centro, S.A. and power increased from 250 watts to 5,000. In the early 2000s, XEOF moved to 740 kHz.

In 2011, XEOF was approved to migrate to FM. It briefly carried the MVS Stereorey format in the early- and mid-2010s before September 2015, when XHEOF flipped and restored the Radio Juventud name once used on sister XEFG.

References

Spanish-language radio stations
Radio stations in Guanajuato